Ultrasound can be modulated to carry an audio signal (like radio signals are modulated). This is often used to carry messages underwater, in underwater diving communicators, and short-range (under five miles) communication with submarines; the received ultrasound signal is decoded into audible sound by a modulated-ultrasound receiver. A modulated ultrasound receiver is a device that receives a modulated ultrasound signal and decodes it for use as sound, navigational-position information, etc. Its function is somewhat like that of a radio receiver.

Range limitation
Due to the absorption characteristics of seawater, ultrasound (sound at frequencies greater than human hearing, or approximately greater than 20,000 hertz) is not used for long-range underwater communications.  The higher the frequency, the faster the sound is absorbed by the seawater, and the more quickly the signal fades.  For this reason, most underwater "telephones" either operate in "baseband" mode (at the same frequency as the voice and is basically a loudspeaker), in a "UQC-1" mode (as defined in MIL-C-15240D) with a modulated carrier of 7,500 Hz, or in "UQC-2" mode (as defined in MIL-C-22509) from around 8,500 hertz to approximately 12,000 hertz, or in the later "WQC-2" mode from 8,500 hertz to approximately 100,000 hertz - with most use around 32,500 hertz) (Also see NATO STANAG-1074 ED.4 for descriptions of internationally used frequencies.)

See also
 Sound from ultrasound for modulated ultrasound that can make its carried signal audible without needing a receiver set.

Ultrasound
Diving equipment
Submarine tactics